Giovanni "Gianni" De Rosa (September 19, 1956 – August 2, 2008) was an Italian football striker who played at Serie A level with Napoli, Como and Perugia, also winning a Serie B topscorer title in 1981 as a Palermo player.

Career
Born in Cerignola, Province of Foggia, he made his professional debut in 1974 with Serie C side Lecco. After a season out on loan at Massese, he was signed by Ternana, where he spent three seasons. In 1980, he made his Serie A debut with Perugia. After a short spell with Como, he was signed by Serie B club Palermo, where he spent two successful season, scoring a total 29 goals and winning a topscorer title in 1981. He then returned to the Italian top flight in 1983, with Napoli, where he spent a single season before to move to Cagliari. He then finally moved to Rimini in his final appearance as a professional player. After his retirement, he settled in Riccione.

Gianni De Rosa died on August 2, 2008 in a road accident in Rimini, as his motorcycle was struck by a bus in the night.

References

1956 births
2008 deaths
People from Cerignola
Italian footballers
Cagliari Calcio players
Palermo F.C. players
S.S.C. Napoli players
Rimini F.C. 1912 players
Ternana Calcio players
A.C. Perugia Calcio players
Como 1907 players
Serie A players
Serie B players
Association football forwards
Road incident deaths in Italy
U.S. Massese 1919 players
Footballers from Apulia
Sportspeople from the Province of Foggia